The Lost River is a river that rises in Vernon Township, Washington County, Indiana, and discharges into the East Fork of the White River in Lost River Township, Martin County, Indiana.  The river's unusual hydrology has led to two of its features being named as National Natural Landmarks.

Description
The river's underground channels may in fact cover hundreds of miles, as the caverns have never been fully explored. The river disappears into a series of sink holes of the type that are abundant in the karstland of southern Indiana. In one square mile there are as many as 1,022 sink holes. The river slips into and out of these sink holes at various points flowing into hidden caverns that connect with multiple other streams, rivers, and springs.

The Lost River begins as a normal river in Washington County, but soon after rising, the river flows over and into a limestone bed (karst) for several miles until the stream bed turns dry; the water is absorbed into the limestone and sinks beneath the surface to a hidden cavern.

The river then flows underground through a network of caves and channels through part of Orleans Township, Paoli Township, and part of Orangeville Township before reappearing on the surface near the village of Orangeville. This spring, the second largest in the state, is known as the True Rise, because many inaccurately believe that the Orangeville Rise is the main channel of the river. The Orangeville rise is a likely tributary of the underground Lost River. The river then continues its westward flow above ground. The rise in Orangeville unfortunately is not picturesque, but is little more than a gloomy pond that feeds a muddy stream.

At most times and under most conditions, other than extreme flooding, the westward-flowing Lost River vanishes into a series of sinkholes in a river bed located close to Indiana State Road 337 four miles (6 km) east of Orleans. The sinkholes into which the river flows are progressively the Stein Swallowhole, then Turner Swallowhole, and, by far the largest, the Tolliver Swallowhole.  The river then flows underground to the National Natural Landmark Wesley Chapel Gulf, which is  large and forms a box canyon with  bedrock walls, where the river briefly appears before once again disappearing below the surface.

Approaching southern Martin County, the river resurfaces from another sink hole. Restored to the Earth's surface, it then flows westward past West Baden Springs and French Lick and flows into the East Fork of the White River.

A USGS stream gauge on the river near Prospect recorded a mean annual discharge of  during water years 2010-2019.

Underground segments
The submerged river and its tributaries probably flow through not one, but a multitude of different channels in the Orleans-Paoli area, most of which are unmapped or poorly understood.  A significant number of sinkholes, some of them of significant dimensions in and of themselves, mark pathways of the underground river and its various channels.  It is possible that the Lost River is carving a cave system for itself of dimensions similar to that of the Mammoth Cave system in nearby Kentucky.

Since 1996 a group from primarily the St. Joseph Valley Grotto has been surveying passages of what is now called the Lost River System. This places it as the second longest cave in Indiana and the 26th longest in the US.

In addition to the underground channels that the Lost River uses for most of its flow, the river also possesses and utilizes a dry surface bed.  During flood times all or part of the river's network of underground channels becomes saturated with water, and part of the Lost River flows in its surface bed in the same manner as a normal river.

National Natural Landmarks
The Wesley Chapel Gulf in eastern Orangeville Township is a  sinkhole which was caused by the collapse of the rock roof over one of the underground channels of the Lost River. It is part of Hoosier National Forest. In 1972, Wesley Chapel Gulf was designated as a National Natural Landmark by the National Park Service.

The Orangeville Rise in central Orangeville Township is a spring from which water wells up in one of the discharge points from the underground hydrological network that carries the flow of the Lost River.  It is a tributary to the Lost River.

See also
List of rivers of Indiana

References

External links
Lost River Field Trip for the Indiana Water Resources Association

National Natural Landmarks in Indiana
Rivers of Orange County, Indiana
Rivers of Indiana
Tributaries of the Wabash River
Rivers of Washington County, Indiana
Rivers of Martin County, Indiana